Sephisa is a genus of butterflies in the family Nymphalidae.

Species
Sephisa dichroa (Kollar, [1844]) – western courtier
Sephisa princeps (Fixsen, 1887)
Sephisa chandra (Moore, [1858]) – eastern courtier
Sephisa daimio Matsumura, 1910

External links
"Sephisa Moore, 1882" at Markku Savela's Lepidoptera and Some Other Life Forms

Apaturinae
Nymphalidae genera
Taxa named by Frederic Moore